The scrub honeyeater (Microptilotis albonotatus) is a species of bird in the family Meliphagidae.
It is found across New Guinea.
Its natural habitats are subtropical or tropical moist lowland forests and subtropical or tropical moist montane forests.

References

scrub honeyeater
Birds of New Guinea
scrub honeyeater
Taxonomy articles created by Polbot